Thiohalomonas denitrificans is a moderately halophilic, obligately chemolithoautotrophic and sulfur-oxidizing bacterium from the genus of Thiohalomonas which has been isolated from sediments of hypersaline lakes from Siberia  in Russia.

References

Chromatiales
Bacteria described in 2007